Mission Creek is a stream in Victoria County, Texas, in the United States.

Mission Creek was named from the nearby La Bahia Spanish mission.

See also
List of rivers of Texas

References

Rivers of Victoria County, Texas
Rivers of Texas